Paul Engemann is an American former pop musician best known for his 1983 song "Scarface (Push It to the Limit)". The song featured prominently in the film Scarface, which was released in the same year.

Biography

With his sister Shawn (now the widow of Larry King), Paul had a small (#91) national chart record, "For Your Love", in 1975, billed as Christopher Paul, and Shawn. His younger sister Shannon Engemann (born 1964) is an actress and a model.

Together with Giorgio Moroder, he had a number one hit in Germany (#81 in USA) with "Reach Out", that became the official song of the 33rd Olympic Games 1984 in Los Angeles. Among other releases were "American Dream" (with Giorgio Moroder 1984), "Face to Face" (1985), "Shannon's Eyes" (1985, 1986), "Brain Power" (Summer School soundtrack) (1987), "To Be Number One" (1990), and "NeverEnding Story" (2000).

Paul Engemann was the frontman of the 1980s band Device, whose only album, the futuristically titled 22B3, was released in the spring of 1986. It produced a Top 40 single with "Hanging on a Heart Attack", which peaked at number 35. Device was formed by musician-songwriter Holly Knight, with Engemann serving as lead vocalist along with Knight, and session guitarist Gene Black. Producer-songwriter Mike Chapman, who had worked with Knight in the past, produced the album.

Engemann joined the band Animotion as co-lead singer with actress Cynthia Rhodes (who replaced Astrid Plane) in 1988 (Engemann took the place of the former male lead Bill Wadhams) and had a top-ten hit with the single "Room to Move" from the Dan Aykroyd movie My Stepmother Is an Alien.  Animotion dissolved in 1990.

Since retiring from the music business, Engemann opened a design business which he ran for approximately 17 years with his wife,  the former actress and model Suzanne Barnes. Their work was featured on the cover of Architectural Digest.

He is currently a top distributor for the Xocai Corporation. He has subsequently appeared in several online commercials, marketing the company's Healthy Chocolate as well as calling for viewers to enlist as distributors.

Engemann has been married to actress and former model Suzanne Barnes since 1985. They have one son, Austin.

Discography

with Device
 22B3 (1986)

with Animotion
 Animotion (1989)

Solo songs
"For Your Love" as Christopher Paul with Shawn Engemann (1975)
"Scarface (Push It to the Limit)" (from Scarface soundtrack) (1983)		
"American Dream" (1984)
"Reach Out" (from 1984 Summer Olympics soundtrack) (1984)
"Shannon's Eyes", "Face to Face" (from Giorgio Moroder's Innovisions) (1985)
"Brain Power" (from Summer School soundtrack) (1987)
"To Be Number One" (from Giorgio Moroder Project's To Be Number One) (1990)

References

External links
Recent article
[ Allmusic Entry]
 

American pop musicians
Living people
Scarface (1983 film)
Year of birth missing (living people)